Joe Hunter Field is a baseball field located in Beeville, TX on the campus of Coastal Bend College formerly known as Bee County Junior College, home to the Cougars.

Sources
 "Texas Almanac 2008-2009," The Dallas Morning News, c.2008

References

Baseball venues in Texas